is a Japanese actor, kabuki actor and TV host. His yagō is matsushimaya. His mon is the Oikake Go-mai Ichō. His current stage name is Ainosuke Kataoka. He is a renowned tachiyaku, specializing in both the aragoto and wagoto styles, which is rare, considering he hails from the Kansai area, where most kabuki actors specialize in the wagoto style.

Filmography

Kabuki

Stage plays

Dramas

Other television

Film

Dubbing

Awards

References

External links
 

1972 births
Living people
Male actors from Osaka Prefecture
People from Sakai, Osaka
Japanese male child actors
Japanese male television actors
Japanese male film actors
Japanese television presenters
21st-century Japanese male actors
Kabuki actors